Ateuchini is a tribe of dung beetles in the family Scarabaeidae. There are at least 30 genera and 370 described species in Ateuchini.

Genera
These 30 genera belong to the tribe Ateuchini:

 Aphengium Harold, 1868
 Ateuchus Weber, 1801
 Bdelyropsis Pereira, Vulcano & Martínez, 1960
 Bdelyrus Harold, 1869
 Besourenga Vaz-de-Mello, 2008
 Bradypodidium Vaz-de-Mello, 2008
 Degallieridium Vaz-de-Mello, 2008
 Deltorhinum Harold, 1867
 Demarziella Balthasar, 1961
 Eutrichillum Martínez, 1969
 Feeridium Vaz de Mello, 2008
 Genieridium Vaz-de-Mello, 2008
 Leotrichillum Vaz-de-Mello, 2008
 Martinezidium Vaz-de-Mello, 2008
 Nunoidium Vaz-de-Mello, 2008
 Onoreidium Vaz-de-Mello, 2008
 Onychothecus Boucomont, 1912
 Paraphytus Harold, 1877
 Pedaria Laporte, 1832
 Pedaridium Harold, 1868
 Pereiraidium Vaz-de-Mello, 2008
 Pleronyx van Lansberge, 1874
 Pseuduroxys Balthasar, 1938
 Scatimus Erichson, 1847
 Scatrichus Génier & Kohlmann, 2003
 Silvinha Vaz-de-Mello, 2008
 Sinapisoma Boucomont, 1928
 Trichillidium Vaz-de-Mello, 2008
 Trichillum Harold, 1868
 Uroxys Westwood, 1842

References

Further reading

External links

 

Scarabaeinae
Articles created by Qbugbot